This is a list of years in Somalia. For only articles about years in Somalia that have been written, see :Category:Years in Somalia.

Colonisation 
Decades: 1880s ·
1890s ·
1900s ·
1910s ·
1920s ·
1930s ·
1940s ·
1950s

20th century

21st century

See also 

 
Somalia history-related lists
Somalia